Sundari is an Indian Bengali television soap opera that premiered on 19 July 2021, and aired on Bengali General Entertainment Channel Sun Bangla. The show was originally produced by Organinc Studios Pvt Ltd and stars Sushrita Ghosh in the titular role. It is the Bengali language remake of Kannada serial Sundari. which itself loosely based on Tamil movie Gopurangal Saivathillai. The show is currently being produced by Little Boxes Communication.

Premise
The story revolves around a girl hailing from a lower-middle-class family called Sundari who lives in a village and is often ill-treated by other villagers due to her dark skin tone. Circumstances forces Shourjo Chowdhury, a rich photographer and Ad agency owner, to marry Sundari while he is in love with Labanya Sen, a rich businesswoman. Unperturbed, Sundari overcomes her challenges and achieves her dreams of becoming an IAS officer.

Cast

Main cast
Sushrita Ghosh as Sundari Goswami Chowdhury – A dark-skinned bright student; Lajbonti's daughter; Malini's cousin and best friend; Shourjo's first wife.
Yuvraj Chowdhury as Shourjo Chowdhury – A playboy; Shankar and Rangana's son; Lakshmi's brother; Krish's best friend; Sundari and Labonyo's husband.
Riya Banik / Srijani Mitra as Labonyo Sen Chowdhury – A rich businesswoman; Manmoni's adopted daughter; Shourjo's love interest turned second wife.

Recurring
Nishantika Das as Ishani Mitra – Sandhya's daughter; Sundari's arch-rival; Shourjo's one-sided lover.
Chaitali Chakraborty as Gayatri Goswami – Sundari's grandmother.
Milan Roy Choudhury as Shankar Chowdhury – Rangana's husband; Lakshmi and Shourjo's father; Malini's grandfather. 
Malabika Sen as Rangana Chowdhury – Shankar's wife; Lakshmi and Shourjo's mother; Malini's grandmother. 
Rajashree Bhowmik as Lajbonti Chowdhury Goswami – Umanath's sister; Sundari's mother.
Animesh Bhaduri as Umanath Chowdhury – Lajbonti's brother; Lakshmi's husband; Malini's father.
Kanyakumari Mukherjee as Lakshmi Chowdhury – Shankar and Rangana's daughter; Shourjo's sister; Umanath's wife; Malini's mother.
Barninee Chakrabarty as Malini Chowdhury – Umanath and Lakshmi's daughter; Sundari's cousin and best friend.
Anindita Saha Kapileshwari as Monidipa "Manmoni" Sen – A businesswoman; Labonyo's adoptive mother.
Aritra Goswami as Krish Chakraborty – Shourjo's best friend and former flatmate.
Rhimjhim Gupta as Sandhya Mitra – Ishani's mother.
Nitya Ganguly as Bimal Mitra – A cunning influential man of Sundari's village.
Suban Roy as Bapi Das – A garage owner in Sundari's village; Malini's admirer.
Arup Roy as Atom – Bapi's sidekick.

Adaptations

References

Bengali-language television programming in India
2021 Indian television series debuts
Sun Bangla original programming